Healer / Across the Shields is an EP by Miami-based band Torche. It was released as a 12″ vinyl with a DVD containing music videos for "Healer" and "Across the Shields". The vinyl was colored either black, orange, or purple. Side A consists of two tracks from Torche's previous release, Meanderthal, while side B contains two tracks that are exclusive to this EP.

This was the last Torche release that involved former guitarist Juan Montoya.

Track listing

Personnel
Steve Brooks – guitar, vocals
Juan Montoya – guitar
Jon Nuñez – bass guitar
Rick Smith – drums

References

2009 EPs
Torche albums
Hydra Head Records EPs